Elizabeth Ann "Lizzie" Neal (born October 8, 1998) is an English field hockey player who plays as a defender or midfielder for Canterbury and the England and Great Britain national teams.

Club career

She plays club hockey in the Women's England Hockey League Division 1 South for Canterbury.

Neal has also played for Loughborough Students

International career

References

External links

1998 births
Living people
English female field hockey players
Women's England Hockey League players
Loughborough Students field hockey players